Soulcalibur VI is a 2018 fighting game developed by Bandai Namco Studios and Dimps and published by Bandai Namco Entertainment for the PlayStation 4, Windows, and Xbox One. It is the seventh main installment in the Soulcalibur series.

Gameplay
Following the tradition of prior installments of the Soulcalibur series, Soulcalibur VI gameplay involves two weapons-wielding combatants battling against one another using a 3D system. The game kept many of the familiar gameplay elements including 8-Way Run, Guard Impact, and character creation, but adds to the traditional formula by introducing new mechanics such as Reversal Edge and the newly revamped Soul Charge. The Reversal Edge allows players to defend against an oncoming attack and quickly strike back, alongside a slow-motion effect, enabling more defensive options for the players.

Characters

Soulcalibur VI contains a base roster consisting of 21 fighters. Additional characters are added through DLC after the game's launch. There are also 100 slots for custom characters. New characters introduced in Soulcalibur VI are marked in italics.

Astaroth
Azwel
Cervantes de Leon
Geralt of Rivia 
Grøh
Inferno 
Ivy Valentine
Kilik
Maxi
Heishiro Mitsurugi
Nightmare
Raphael Sorel
Seong Mi-na
Siegfried Schtauffen
Sophitia Alexandra
Taki
Talim
Voldo
Chai Xianghua
Yoshimitsu
Zasalamel

DLC

2B (YoRHa No. 2 Type B) 
Amy Sorel 
Cassandra Alexandra 
Haohmaru 
Hildegard von Krone  
Hwang Seong-gyeong 
Setsuka  
Tira

Notes
 Guest character. DLC Guests are not part of the game's storyline Downloadable content (number denotes the season in which the respective character is a dlc) Unlockable, unplayable online

Plot
Soulcalibur VI serves as a sequel and a reboot to the series, taking place during the 16th century to revisit the events of the first Soulcalibur game/second Soul series game entry to "uncover hidden truths". It takes place after the events of Soulcalibur V (which is during the Soul Chronicles of Cassandra, Amy and Zasalamel's stories) where Cassandra from the original timeline tells her past self about the grim future of the Alexandra family, Amy's original future-self is revealed to be Viola, and Zasalamel receives a vision from his future self that causes him to abandon his plan to seek death and decide to lead humanity to a brighter future.

The plot of Soulcalibur VI begins from a remake of the second Soul game entry, taking place from 1583 to 1589, long before the events of 1590 trilogy games. In addition, the story is divided into two separate modes. The Soul Chronicle is the main plot of the story, concerning the main characters and the immediate threat of Nightmare. In this mode, the story is told similar to a visual novel with illustrated, voiced cut scenes telling the plot and are broken up by matches acting as significant battles in-story. The first main story is centered around the character of Kilik as he ventures out to confront the Soul Edge and Nightmare and takes place mostly in Europe. In addition, every character is also given an individual story line detailing their backstories or serving as side stories to the main plot, one of the characters’ story timeline chapters takes place after the first main story, a year before the events of the original trilogy.

The second story mode, named the Libra of Soul, takes place shortly after the Evil Seed event of 1583 wherein Siegfried acquired the Soul Edge and became Nightmare. In this mode, the player creates a custom character that serves as the protagonist. Mostly centered in Asia, the player must go through a journey to prevent Azwel from recreating the Evil Seed all the while dealing with their own malfestation. This runs concurrently with the main plot in the Soul Chronicle and on occasion the player character will encounter other characters from the main story.

Libra of Soul
Note: due to the number of in-game side missions, this is solely based on the linear story

In 1584, about a year after the Evil Seed ravaged the world, the hero (dubbed the Conduit) awakens from a violent nightmare involving Soul Edge and a mysterious realm. Zasalamel appears before them and explains that the energy of the Evil Seed has linked their soul to the realm, Astral Chaos, and unless they absorb the energy from astral fissures that have been appearing as of late, their soul will be shredded from the pressure, resulting in their death. Zasalamel then trains the Conduit on how to absorb the energy of the fissures and gives them a special scale called the Libra of Soul.

After closing several fissures with the help of Maxi and Mitsurugi, the Conduit is approached by Groh, Dion, and Natalie, members of the mysterious Aval Organization tasked with hunting down rogue Aval scientist Azwel and his cult-like followers, the Qualifiers. Knowing only that Azwel has taken an interest in the astral fissures as well as the circumstances behind the Evil Seed, Groh conscripts the Conduit into their group as they're the only one capable of closing the fissures. However, Azwel manages to gain the energy of the fissures and reveals his intention to create a similar Evil Seed event he calls the "Ultimate Seed" in order to protect humanity from its own self destructive tendencies. Groh, who was partially corrupted by Soul Edge's evil due to Azwel's meddling, gives in to the evil and tackles Azwel off a cliff to no avail.

Knowing only that Azwel intends to use Nightmare's former base at Ostrheinsburgh Castle, the Conduit seeks out Zasalamel to figure out what to do. Zasalamel informs the Conduit that, even though their absorption of the fissures has made them stronger and stopped Astral Chaos' hazardous effect on them, only Soul Edge and Soul Calibur have the power to stop Azwel, but both have been sealed away inside Astral Chaos and the Conduit needs to draw upon their power through combat with people connected to the blades (Kilik, Xianghua, and Siegfried for Soul Calibur and Taki, Sophitia, and Cervantes de Leon for Soul Edge). Once they gather enough strength, the Conduit confronts Azwel and, despite Azwel's attempts to use them as the last piece of the Ultimate Seed, kills him.

However, before they can rest, the Conduit is contacted by the Aval Organization and informed that Groh survived his encounter with Azwel but must be killed due to his malfestation. After tracking him to Scandinavia, the Conduit once again draws on the Soul swords to confront him.

The ending of Libra of Souls is based on the player's alignment during the game. Should it be aligned toward darkness, the Conduit draws on Soul Edge and strikes down Groh before burying him. Should it align toward the light, the Conduit will draw on Soul Calibur and purge Groh of his malfestation, who then continues his work with the Aval Organization from a distance.

Development and release

Soulcalibur VI was announced during The Game Awards 2017. Development on the game began over three years earlier. Producer Motohiro Okubo called the game a celebration of the franchise's 20th anniversary. Bandai Namco focused more on story elements than in the previous games in the series. It runs on Unreal Engine 4 like Bandai Namco's previous fighting game, Tekken 7. According to Okubo, the title's code name was "Luxor" due to the team's intentions on making the game feel brighter like it was in the first Soulcalibur. Additional mechanics were introduced to help players with the game's learning curve.

The game was released for PlayStation 4, Windows, and Xbox One, on October 19, 2018. Its Collectors Edition came with an art book, a soundtrack, a Sophitia statue, and a metal case. A series of season passes for the game each include four additional characters and more items for character customization.

Reception

Soulcalibur VI received generally positive reviews. Game Informer and EGM both praised the story modes. VideoGamer.com praised the environments, while Destructoid praised the music and the character roster. Game Revolution reviewer opined it was "one of the most enjoyable fighting games I’ve ever played." IGN summarised it: "The new mechanics add new layers of strategy and mind games while the one-two punch of Libra of Soul and Soul Chronicle will provide hours upon hours of fantastic single-player content." 4Players praised the netcode, while HobbyConsolas praised the character creation. GameSpot's Tamoor Hussain said it was "both intuitive and deep". Dead or Alive 6 director and producer Yohei Shimbori commented he could not understand why his series is being criticized so much for the fan service content while Soulcalibur VI "can do it and doesn't get a beating over it."

Sales 
The game reached number 5 in the UK sales chart. In Japan, it sold 24,049 copies within its first week on sale, reaching number 3. It reached number 8 in Australia and number 7 in New Zealand. In the US, it was the 8th most downloaded game of October on the PlayStation Store. Sales were reported to be up from Soulcalibur V and compared to Soulcalibur III, Soulcalibur and Soul Blade, but still lower than Soulcalibur II and Soulcalibur IV. In 2019, Namco reported the launch as "successful". As of July 2021, the game has sold over two million copies worldwide.

Accolades

References

External links

Soulcalibur VI at MobyGames

2018 video games
3D fighting games
Bandai Namco games
Crossover fighting games
Fighting games
Fighting games used at the Evolution Championship Series tournament
Multiplayer and single-player video games
PlayStation 4 games
PlayStation 4 Pro enhanced games
Soulcalibur series games
Windows games
Video games developed in Japan
Video game reboots
Video games set in the 16th century
Video games with downloadable content
Xbox One games
Xbox One X enhanced games
Unreal Engine games
Video games scored by Junichi Nakatsuru
Video games with AI-versus-AI modes
Video games with customizable avatars
Dimps games